Rhino Rock is a prominent black rock with steep sides rising to 700 m, standing 5 nautical miles (9 km) southwest of Cape Rymill on the east coast of Palmer Land. It was named Rhino Horn Rock for its suggestive appearance by members of the East Base of the United States Antarctic Service (USAS) who charted the area on land and from the air in 1940, but the name has been shortened to Rhino Rock.
 

Rock formations of Palmer Land